The women's 80 metres hurdles event at the 1959 Pan American Games was held at the Soldier Field in Chicago on 31 August and 1 September.

Medalists

Results

Heats
Wind:Heat 1: +3.2 m/s, Heat 2: +1.2 m/s

Final
Wind: +1.8 m/s

References

Athletics at the 1959 Pan American Games
1959